The Banker is a 2020 American period drama film directed, co-written and produced by George Nolfi. The film stars Anthony Mackie, Nicholas Hoult, Nia Long, Jessie T. Usher and Samuel L. Jackson. The story follows Joe Morris (Jackson) and Bernard Garrett (Mackie), two of the first African-American bankers in the United States.

Plot 
In 1954, Bernard Garrett wants to get into real estate but encounters racism that prevents him from being a successful real estate investor. After a chance encounter with wealthy club owner Joe Morris, he convinces Joe to be his co-investor. Together they convince Matt Steiner, a white man, to pose as the front of the company in meetings to facilitate the sales. Eventually, they become extremely successful in Los Angeles real estate, with the two teaching Matt the basics of real estate investing. The three secure a number of properties in L.A. and effectively integrate a number of previously segregated neighborhoods by selling and renting to black families. After this success, he sets his sights on the local bank in his Texas hometown to give loans to the black residents. Racist bank practices had excluded black people from receiving loans for small businesses and homeownership. Joe protests the idea at first but eventually relents and the three move to Texas.

Matt buys the bank, fronting for Bernard and Joe, but the local townspeople are extremely suspicious of this move. A bank executive tracks the records of the loans and discovers that they're giving loans to black people, follows Matt and discovers that his partners are black, then threatens them with exposure which would cause "a run on the bank." Matt persuades Joe and Bernard to purchase a second bank and put him in charge of it despite his inexperience. The racist bank executive calls in a federal investigator who checks the records of Matt's bank and discovers numerous infractions attributable to Matt's carelessness. Matt, Bernard and Joe get arrested for violating federal banking laws. 
 
Facing a 50-year prison term, Matt takes a plea deal, falsely testifying that he was duped by Bernard and Joe. The next day, Bernard testifies passionately about black people being given the same opportunity for upward mobility as whites. He and Joe are convicted and serve time in prison; upon release, they go with Bernard's wife Eunice to live in the Bahamas in two homes which Matt had purchased for them with money Bernard had entrusted to him for that purpose the night before Bernard's testimony.

Cast

 Anthony Mackie as Bernard Garrett
 Nicholas Hoult as Matt Steiner
 Samuel L. Jackson as Joe Morris
 Nia Long as Eunice Garrett
 Scott Daniel Johnson as Robert Florance, Jr.
 Taylor Black as Susie
 Michael Harney as Melvin Belli
 Colm Meaney as Patrick Barker
 Paul Ben-Victor as Donald Silverthorne
 Jessie T. Usher as Tony Jackson
 Gregory Alan Williams as Britton Garrett
 Rhoda Griffis as Mrs. Barker
 Travis West as Mrs. Cooper's Son
 David Alexander as Mr. Miller
 Jaylon Gordon as Bernard Garrett Jr.

Production
It was announced in October 2018 that George Nolfi would direct the film, which he co-wrote with Niceole Levy. Samuel L. Jackson, Anthony Mackie, Nicholas Hoult, Nia Long and Taylor Black were set to star, with filming beginning in Atlanta. The film was partially shot in Douglasville, Georgia and Newnan, Georgia. Additional casting was announced in November. The film's early apartment scenes were filmed at La Madre Arms apartments in Atlanta, GA.

Release
In July 2019, Apple TV+ acquired distribution rights to the film. It was set to have its world premiere at AFI Fest on November 21, 2019, followed by a limited theatrical release on December 6, 2019, and digital streaming in January 2020. However, after claims of sexual assault were made against one of the producers of the film, Bernard Garrett's son Bernie Jr., by his half-sisters, the premiere was cancelled and the film was pulled from the schedule.

Bernie Jr's half-sisters also accused the filmmakers of writing their mother, Linda, out of the movie. He denies the claims of sexual assault, citing a family conflict surrounding Linda's infidelity and subsequent separation from his father, and the filmmakers maintain that the account of events depicted in the film are the result of independent research and not Bernie Jr's recollection.

The film was eventually released in a limited theatrical release on March 6, 2020, followed by digital streaming on March 20, 2020.

Reception

Critical reception 
The site's critical consensus reads: "The Bankers timid approach to dramatizing its fact-based story is often outweighed by the trio of strong performances at its core." On Metacritic, the film has a weighted average score of 59 out of 100, based on 19 critics, indicating "mixed or average reviews".

Accolades

References

External links
 – official site

2020 drama films
2020s English-language films
African-American drama films
African-American films
Apple TV+ original films
Films about banking
Films about landlords
Films about racism in the United States
Films directed by George Nolfi
Films set in 1939
Films set in 1954
Films set in 1955
Films set in 1963
Films set in 1965
Films set in Los Angeles
Films set in Texas
Films set in Washington, D.C.
Films shot in Atlanta
Films shot in Newnan, Georgia
Films with screenplays by George Nolfi
2020s American films